Susana Seivane (born 25 August 1976) is a Galician musician. She was born in Barcelona, Spain, into a family of well-known Galician luthiers and musicians, the Seivane family, whose workshop is the Obradoiro de Gaitas Seivane. She is influenced by skilled bagpipers and is notable in traditional Galician music for synthesizing the style of the ancient bagpipers while creating her own style including other musical influences.   
Born in Barcelona to a Galician family, she is thereof Galician, from a Coruña to be exact, which is where she has been living for many years now, back in her family home where her family's luthier is located. Many people from Galicia emigrated to other parts of Spain or around the world.

Festivals 
From 1999, when Susana Seivane issued her first album, the gaiteira gave many concerts and participated in festivals in Spain, other European countries and the United States, receiving praise from the public and from critics. She goes to many important national and international festivals and travels around the world, having attended the Festival Celtic Connections in Scotland, the Festival Rudolstadt in Germany, the Dranouter Fest in Belgium, the Irish Festival in Italy, the Festival Interceltique de Lorient in Brittany, the Brampton Festival, Eastleigh Summer Music Festival, and Cambridge Folk Festival in England, and the Malahide International Festival of Piping & Drumming in Ireland. In France she has performed in concert in Paris, Nantes, Lyons, Les Irlandays, Juvisy sur Orge, the Festival du Bout du Monde and the Festival de Saint-Loup in Guingamp. In Spain she has played at the Festival Folk de Getxo, the Mercat de la Música Viva de Vic in Barcelona, La Mar de Músicas at Cartagena, the Festival Mendébala de Bizkaia, the Festival Folk de Segovia, San Froilán de Barcelona, Karrantza de Bizkaia, and the Festival Folk de Cantabria. She often appears in Galicia at venues such as the Festival do Mundo Celta de Ortigueira, San Froilán en Lugo, Festas de Maria Pita, Praza Maior de Ourense, Praza da Quintana de Santiago de Compostela, and Pontevedra.

Discography 
Susana Seivane (1999)
Alma de buxo (2001)
Mares de tempo (2004)
Os soños que volven (2009)

Compilations
Celtic Colours; Vol 4 (2001) (1 song)
Celtic Women (Keltia)

Accolades
Finalist in the Indie Awards 2001
4th Premio Xarmenta in 2008 for her defense of the Galician language
Premio Artista of the TVG
Premio Opinión (twice)
Star of the year

Press 

"With her, folk regains grounds for hope"—ABC
"Her way of understanding bagpipes, far from being experimental or open, speaks from the tradition"—ABC
"Susana Seivane, caste bagpiper: although the Galician tradition was always at the centre of Susana Seivane's musical life, this muse of bagpipes injects a renewed and innovative flavouring to her songs and records. Susana Seivane is an inspired and inspiring muse, especially when she sails the seas of time with the sounds of her magic gaita"--World Music
"Her concerts are, surely, the most refined expression that Galician traditional music can reach"--Diario de Pontevedra

See also
 Galician traditional music

External links 
  (in Galician, French, Spanish, English and Breton)
Obradoiro de gaitas Seivane

Musicians from Galicia (Spain)
Players of Galician bagpipes
Players of Spanish bagpipes
1976 births
Living people
Galician traditional music groups